Super Sireyna Worldwide 2018 was the 2nd Super Sireyna Worldwide pageant, held on 19 May 2018. The event was held at Broadway Centrum, Manila, Philippines. Miss Sahhara of Nigeria crowned her successor Nicole Guevarra Flores of Philippines at the end of the event.

Results

Placements

Special Awards

Contestants
Eight Contestants competed for the title:

Did not compete

References

2018 beauty pageants